is  the  Head coach of the Cyberdyne Ibaraki Robots in the Japanese B.League.

Head coaching record

|-
| style="text-align:left;"|Tsukuba Robots
| style="text-align:left;"|2014-15
| 38||6||32|||| style="text-align:center;"|7th in NBL Eastern|||-||-||-||
| style="text-align:center;"|12th in NBL
|-
| style="text-align:left;"|Cyberdyne Ibaraki Robots
| style="text-align:left;"|2016-17
| 60||32||28|||| style="text-align:center;"|2nd in B2 Eastern|||-||-||-||
| style="text-align:center;"|-
|-

References

1988 births
Living people
Cyberdyne Ibaraki Robots coaches
Japanese basketball coaches